Agladrillia nitens is a species of sea snail, a marine gastropod mollusk in the family Drilliidae.

Description
The length of the shell attains 12 mm. The 8 whorls are carinately shouldered. The flesh-brown shell shows longitudinal, sharp, oblique ribs, pointed on the shoulder-angle, and extending to the suture, and revolving striae. The outer lip is sharp. The aperture is oval. The siphonal canal is short.

Distribution
This marine species occurs off North Australia, New Guinea and the Makassar Strait.

References

External links
 Brazier, J. 1876. A list of the Pleurotomidae collected during the Chevert expedition, with the description of the new species. Proceedings of the Linnean Society of New South Wales 1: 151–162
 Hinds R.B. (1844–1845) The Zoology of the Voyage of H. M. S. “Sulphur”, Under the command of Captain Sir Edward Belcher, R.N., C.B., F.R.G.S., etc., during the years 1836–42. Vol. II, Mollusca. Smith, Elder and Co., London, v + 72 pp., 21 pls
 M.M. Schepman, full text of "Siboga expeditie"

nitens
Gastropods described in 1843